"Tryin' to Get to Heaven" is a song written and performed by the American singer-songwriter Bob Dylan, recorded in January 1997 and released in September that year as the fifth track on his album Time Out of Mind. The recording was produced by Daniel Lanois.

Composition and recording
The song is a medium-tempo folk-rock ballad whose narrator has traveled "all around the world" and, in the song's memorable refrain, is "trying to get to heaven before they close the door". It is notable for being the only song on Time Out of Mind on which Dylan plays the harmonica. In their book Bob Dylan All the Songs: The Story Behind Every Track, authors Philippe Margotin and Jean-Michel Guesdon call the song "hypnotic" and compare its sound to the work of Bruce Springsteen and Phil Spector. They note that Dylan's harmonica solo, which "requires several hearings to appreciate", achieves an unusual "electric" effect because of the way engineer Mark Howard ran it through a distortion box. The song is performed in the key of A major.

Critical reception
Dylan scholar Jochen Markhorst ranks the song among the author's "most beautiful works," noting that it's similar to but "more accessible" than the celebrated "Not Dark Yet" because it offers the "prospect of redemption in an afterlife".

Spectrum Culture included the song on a list of "Bob Dylan's 20 Best Songs of the '90s". In an article accompanying the list, critic David Harris calls it "one of the many triumphs" on Time Out of Mind and notes, "More than anything, “'Tryin'’ to Get to Heaven' sounds like an aging songwriter taking stock, reliving glories of travel and sexual conquests before he skips off this mortal coil".

A 2021 article in the Irish Independent named it one of the "all-time top 10 tracks by Bob Dylan", noting that, "as Dylan said of one of his own favourites, Neil Young’s 'Only Love Can Break Your Heart', you just want it to go on for ever".

Live performances
Between 1999 and 2019, Bob Dylan performed the song 335 times in concert on the Never Ending Tour. A live version from October 5, 2000 in London, done in a jazz arrangement and with a slower tempo, was officially released on The Bootleg Series Vol. 8: Tell Tale Signs: Rare and Unreleased 1989–2006. The live debut occurred in Lisbon, Portugal on April 7, 1999, a performance that was made available to stream on Dylan's official website in August 1999. Another live version, performed in Washington, D.C. on April 4, 2004, was made available to stream on Dylan's site that same month. The last performance to date took place at The Anthem in Washington, D.C. on December 8, 2019.

Cover versions
David Bowie's version, originally recorded in 1998, was officially released as a single on January 8, 2021.

Robyn Hitchcock covered it on his 2004 album Spooked.

Joan Osborne covered it on her 2017 album Songs of Bob Dylan.

Lucinda Williams has officially released two cover versions of the song: one on the Chimes of Freedom compilation album in 2012 and another for her 2020 live album Lu's Jukebox Vol. 3 - Bob's Back Pages: A Night Of Bob Dylan Songs.

Phosphorescent 2022 cover on Spotify

References

External links
Lyrics from Bob Dylan's official site

Bob Dylan songs
Columbia Records singles
Song recordings produced by Daniel Lanois
Songs written by Bob Dylan